Gerardo Andrés Sofovich (March 18, 1937 – March 8, 2015) was an Argentine businessman, dramaturge, television host and presenter, comedian, scriptwriter, and director.

He was the producer of Polémica en el bar and La noche del Domingo, two of the most popular Argentine TV shows of the 1970s and 1980s. Sofovich also hosted A la manera de Sofovich and Sin Límite SMS, which were broadcast on Canal 9. During the 1970s and 1980s he directed several picaresque films starring comedians Alberto Olmedo and Jorge Porcel.As a businessman, he backed up major shows on Buenos Aires' Corrientes Avenue theaters.

Health problems
Sofovich suffered a heart attack in 1992 at age 55. He had 15 stents put in and had twelve 12 angioplasties. On October 8, 2014, it was revealed that Sofovich had been connected to an artificial respirator and was sedated at Clinica Suizo-Argentina hospital after suffering a pulmonary infection, which complicated his health chronic obstructive pulmonary disease condition. He died on March 8, 2015, aged 77.

References

External links

1937 births
2015 deaths
People from Buenos Aires
Argentine businesspeople
Argentine television personalities
Argentine film directors
Dramaturges
20th-century dramatists and playwrights
Bailando_por_un_Sueño_(Argentine_TV_series)_judges

Argentine Jews
Argentine people of Russian-Jewish descent